Jorge Dalto (July 8, 1948 – October 27, 1987) was a pop, jazz and Afro-Cuban music pianist from Argentina, and the former musical director and keyboardist (together with Ronnie Foster) for George Benson, contributing the acoustic piano intro and solo to Benson's 1976 Grammy-winning hit version of Leon Russell's "This Masquerade". He also performed with Tito Puente, Grover Washington, Spyro Gyra, Fuse One, Gato Barbieri, Willie Colon and others. He died of cancer at the age of 39.

Dalto's wife, Adela, is a jazz singer. His son, Billy, served in the Oregon House of Representatives from 2003 to 2007.

Discography

As leader
1976: Chevere, with Adela Dalto (vocals), Bernard Purdie (drums), Ronnie Foster (keyboards), Tom Malone (trombone), Jerry Dodgion (alto, flute), Ernie Royal (trumpet), Victor Paz (trumpet), Rubén Blades
1983: Rendezvous, with David Sanborn (alto sax), Bob Mintzer (tenor sax), Tom Browne (trumpet), Artie Webb (flute), George Benson (guitar), Eric Gale (guitar), Ted Pearlman (guitar), Anthony Jackson (bass), Steve Gadd (drums), Buddy Williams (drums), Hector Casanova (drums, guiro), Carlos Valdes (congas), Nicky Marrero (timbales, bells, cowbell, wood block), Mark Hood (recorder, bells, engineer, mixing), Adela Dalto (vocals), Jocelyn Brown (vocals), Lillias White (vocals).
1983: Solo Piano
1984: New York Nightline, with Bob Mintzer (tenor sax, clarinet), Jay Beckenstein (alto sax), Alan Rubin (trumpet), Dave Valentin (flute), Carlos Valdes (congas), Nicky Marrero (timbales), Buddy Williams (drums), Steve Gadd (drums), Anthony Jackson (bass), Will Lee (bass), George Benson (guitar), Jeff Mironov (guitar), Bill Washer (guitar), Mark Gray (synthesizer).
1985: Urban Oasis, with Buddy Williams (drums); Adela Dalto (vocal); Carlos Valdes (congas); Nicky Marrero (timbales); Artie Webb (flute); Sal Cuevas (bass); Jose Mangual, Sr (bongos); Sergio Brandao (bass); Andy Gonzalez (bass); Jose Neto (guitar).
1988: Listen Up (posthumous release, recorded in 1978), with Stanley Banks (bass guitar);George Benson, Phil Upchurch (guitar); Hubert Laws (flute); Michael Brecker (tenor sax), Randy Brecker (trumpet, flugelhorn); Ronnie Foster (synthesizers); Anthony Jackson (bass guitar); Harvey Mason (drums); Frank Malabé (percussion).

As sideman
With Spyro Gyra
Incognito (1982)
City Kids (1983)
Collection (1991)
With Chet Baker
Studio Trieste (CTI, 1982) with Jim Hall and Hubert Laws
With George Benson
Breezin' (1976)
In Flight (1977)
Weekend in L.A. (1978)
Livin' Inside Your Love (1979)
With Dizzy Gillespie and Machito
Afro-Cuban Jazz Moods (Pablo, 1975)
With Grant Green
Easy (1978)
With Heaven and Earth
Refuge (1973)
With Willie Colón
Tiempo pa` matar (1983)
With Gato Barbieri
Yesterdays (1974)

Whit Djavan '''  Luz (Djavan Album) 1982

References

External links

Latin jazz pianists
Smooth jazz pianists
Jazz fusion pianists
Jazz-funk pianists
Jazz-pop pianists
1948 births
1987 deaths
American jazz pianists
American male pianists
Argentine jazz pianists
20th-century American pianists
20th-century American male musicians
American male jazz musicians
Argentine emigrants to the United States
Deaths from cancer in New York (state)